The Roman Catholic Diocese of Qinzhou/Tsínchow/Tianshui is a diocese located in Qinzhou (Gansu) in the Ecclesiastical province of Lanzhou in China.

History
 April 28, 1905: Established as Apostolic Vicariate of Southern Kansu 甘肅南境 from the Apostolic Vicariate of Kan-su 甘肅
 March 8, 1922: Renamed as Apostolic Vicariate of Eastern Kansu 甘肅東境
 December 3, 1924: Renamed as Apostolic Vicariate of Qinzhou 秦州
 April 11, 1946.04.11: Promoted as Diocese of Qinzhou 秦州

Leadership
 Bishops of Qinzhou 秦州 (Roman rite)
 Bishop John Wang Ruowang (August 19, 2011 – present)
 Acting Bishop John Wang Ruowang (July 24, 2003 - August 19, 2011)
 Bishop Casimir Wang Mi-lu (January 28, 1981 - July 24, 2003)
 Bishop Peter G. Grimm, O.F.M. Cap. (April 21, 1949 – November 17, 1959)
 Vicars Apostolic of Qinzhou 秦州 (Roman Rite)
 Bishop Salvador-Pierre Walleser (March 28, 1922 – January 1, 1946)
 Vicars Apostolic of Southern Kansu 甘肅南境 (Roman Rite)
 Fr. Costante Daems, C.I.C.M. (1914–1922)
 Bishop Everard Ter Laak, C.I.C.M. (1905 – May 6, 1914)

References

 GCatholic.org
 Catholic Hierarchy

Roman Catholic dioceses in China
Christian organizations established in 1905
Roman Catholic dioceses and prelatures established in the 20th century
1905 establishments in China
Religion in Gansu